William George Davies (3 July 1936 – 17 July 2022) was a Welsh cricketer born in Barry, Glamorgan, who played for Glamorgan from 1954 to 1960. He appeared in 32 first-class matches as a right-handed batsman who bowled right-arm medium fast. He scored 674 runs with a highest score of 64 and took 16 wickets with a best performance of two for 23.

Though primarily a batter, he took a wicket with his first ball in first-class cricket (in his fourth match for Glamorgan, at The Oval in May 1957); coming on as first change, he had Surrey's Tom Clark caught in the gully by Jim Pressdee.

Davies died in Llandough, Penarth on 17 July 2022, at the age of 86.

References

External links
 

1936 births
2022 deaths
Glamorgan cricketers
Welsh cricketers
Sportspeople from Barry, Vale of Glamorgan
Cricketers from the Vale of Glamorgan